Seoni  is a city and a municipality in Seoni district in the Indian state of Madhya Pradesh. This tribal household dominated district was formed in the year 1956.
Rudyard Kipling used the forests in the vicinity of Seoni, or as was spelled during British colonial rule, Seeonee, as the setting for the Mowgli stories in The Jungle Book and The Second Jungle Book (1894–1895), although the area is not an actual rainforest. Seoni is a city where tributary of the river Godavari, the Wainganga, originates.
Seoni is reachable by road, major adjacent cities are Nagpur and Jabalpur. The National Highway 44 north–south corridor crosses from Seoni. The nearest airport is Nagpur (130 km); a small airport (air-strip) is available at Seoni near Sukhtara village for landing charter airplanes/helicopters.
The Wainganga is a river in India originating in the Mahadeo Hills in Mundara near the village Gopalganj in Seoni, Madhya Pradesh. It is a key tributary of the Godavari. The river flows south in a winding course through the states of Madhya Pradesh and Maharashtra, roughly 579 km (360 mi). After joining the Wardha River, the united stream, which is known as the Pranahita River, empties into the Godavari River at Kaleshwaram, Telangana.

Geography
It has an average elevation of 611 metres (2005 feet).

The city is 2,005 ft. above sea level, halfway between Nagpur and Jabalpur. , the city had a population of 102,343. It was founded in 1774, and contains large public gardens, a market place and a tank dalsagar. It has 37% forest cover. The Seoni district is located in the southern part of Madhya Pradesh. Geographically the district extends over an area of 8758 km2. It is bordered by Jabalpur, Narsinghpur and Mandla districts to the north, Balaghat to the east and Chhindwara to the west and shares its southern boundary with Nagpur (Maharashtra). National Highway No. 44 is the longest highway of India that connects Kanyakumari-Banaras and passes through the district from north to south. Fair weather roads connect the major towns in the district. The narrow-gauge Chhindwara-Nainpur Railway line passed through Seoni, connecting: Jabalpur, Nagpur, Chhindwara, Balaghat, Katangi, Keolari and Nainpur. The railway line has since been converted to broad gauge.

Climate

Demographics

As of the 2011 Census of India, Seoni had a population of 102,343. Males constitute 50.45% of the population and females 49.55%. Seoni has an average literacy rate of 90.46%, male literacy is 94.71%, and female literacy is 86.03%.

Tourist attractions

Pench Tiger Reserve
The River Bainganga's source is located beneath the village Mundara, where it includes for example the Pench Tiger Reserve within 10 km.  The Pench Tiger Reserve is named after the Pench River, which flows from north to south through the reserve, and is located in the southern reaches of the Satpura hill ranges in the Seoni and Chhindwara districts in the Madhya Pradesh state of India. The terrain is undulating, with most of the area covered by small hill ranges, steeply sloping on the sides.  The Pench National Park is named after the Pench River, which flows from north to south through the park. This river constitutes the district boundary of Seoni and Chhindwara districts of Madhya Pradesh in the upper region and State boundary with Maharashtra State in the lower region. This area became the 19th tiger reserve of India in 1992.  The tourist traffic is experiencing fast growth in this park.Pench
The Pench National Park which constitutes the core of the tiger reserves was notified in the year 1983. The total area of the park is 292.85 km2. The total area of the Pench Tiger Reserve is 757.85 km2.

The reserve is situated in an area that holds a significant place in the natural history of Central India. Descriptions of its flora and fauna have appeared in wildlife books dating back to the 17th century. Books written in the 19th and early 20th century by naturalists like Captain J. Forsyth and Rudyard Kipling's Jungle Book cover the panorama of nature's abundance in this tract.

A forest belt extends in three directions: north, east and south, covering forest tracts of Seoni, Balaghat and Nagpur districts. The contiguous forest on the southern side in the Maharashtra state of India, initially named Pandit Jawaharlal Nehru National Park has been recently included in the Project Tiger network under the same name as this reserve. A dam was constructed on the Pench River on south-eastern boundary of the reserve.

The area is criss-crossed by numerous seasonal streams and "nalas". The Pench River flowing through the central line of the reserve is dry by the end of April but a number of water pools locally known locally as "dohs" are found, which serve as waterholes for wild animals. A few perennial springs also exist in this area. However, the water sources are not suitably distributed, hence large area remains unused by the wild animals. The Pench reservoir at the center of the reserve is the only major water source during pinch period.

As the prey concentration is high along the Pench River, tigers usually inhabit this belt. Leopards, though, generally operate in the peripheral areas but are occasionally seen in deep forests also. Jungle cats are commonly seen. Leopard cats, small Indian civet and palm civet are common but seen very rarely.

Wild dogs are commonly seen in packs of 12 to 15, near Chhedia, Jamtara, Bodanala and Pyorthadi areas of the reserve. Wild boars are ubiquitous. Sloth bears occupy the hilly, rocky outcrops and favour mahul bel-infested forest. Chinkara are present in very small numbers and are found in open areas around Turia, Telia, and Dudhgaon villages. Jackals are seen occasionally near Tekadi, Alikatta and Chhindimatta villages.

Pench Jungle Camp Pench Tiger Reserve
A resort with wooden huts and rustic appeal, that has been designed to create an experience of living in nature, with nature! Located in the Seoni District, Thesil Kurai, INDIA approximately 32 km from SEONI, PENCH JUNGLE CAMP is conveniently located in the thick of the buffer of the Pench National Park.
Nestled cozily in the wilderness amidst the flora and fauna of Pench, home to Mowgli*, PENCH JUNGLE CAMP is an enticing getaway from urban contemporary living.
Legend has it that Pench was the place where Mowgli was born.

Bheemgarh Dam
Bheemgarh Dam, also known as Sanjay Sarovar Bandh and Upper Wainganga dam, is built Across the Wainganga river in Chhapara tehsil of Seoni district of Indian state of Madhya Pradesh.
The Bhimgarh Sanjay Sarovar Dam is located 43 km away from the Seoni. It is known as the biggest Mud / Earthen dam of Asia. It is bounded by mountains from all sides.

Amodagarh
Amodagarh is a place offered by Seoni tourism to its visitors. It is supposed that this place was the work place of "Mowgli" of author Rudyard Kipling's book "The Jungle Book". This place is situated on the Seoni-Mandla state highway. From Amodagarh tourists can see the remains of the palace of Sona Rani. The place has a clef, a hilly nalla with exposed rocks. This place is visited before sunset as forest animals come out. The place lies at a distance of approximately 10 kilometres from Chhui and about 32 kilometres from Seoni. Importance of this place increased as it has fair chances of a place of Mugli (as pronounced) due to existence of village "Ugly" at the other end of this forest in Seoni district.

Matradham
There is a village 15 km west in the Seoni district of "Katalbodi" also known as Matradham. The Hindu guru Shankara Acharya constructed a Shiv Temple here in 2003 in honour of the birthplace of his mother.

Guru Rataneshwar Dham (Gurudham, Dighori)
World's Largest Sphatik Shivling
Hindu Guru Shankra Acharya also constructed a big Guru Rataneshwar Dham (sphatik Shivling - 54 kg world biggest and 21 kg paras shivling) in Dighori village (his birthplace), which is on the north side of Seoni and is 25 km away from this town.

List of other Tourist spots

Religious Place in Seoni
https://seoni.nic.in/en/tourism/

Usama Khan home located near old water tank Sanjay ward Seoni 
Math Temple Seoni
Sun Temple Seoni
Vaayuveera Hanumaan Mandir, Dighori
13th century the Kali temple of Ashta
Kal Bhairav Temple Adeganv
Sri Guru Ratneshwar Dham Dighori
Sri Shivdham Mathaghogra
Mundara, the Origin of river Bainganga
Banjari Devi Temple Chhapara
Vaishno Devi Temple Siladehi
Ambamai  temple Aamagarh
Rachharia Babaji Temple Dhanora
Digambar Jain Temple
Church built in Year 1878
Badi Jiyarat Dargah Seoni
Protestant Church Suture
Anglican Church Suture
Chandralok Indrabhavan Seoni
Jama Masjid Tigga Mohalla

Historical sites of Seoni
https://seoni.nic.in/en/tourism/
Martyr Memorial Turiya
Fort of Adeganv
Government Special Home (Sudharalay)
Chhapara Fort (Gadhi), Wavadi
Mission Higher Secondary School Seoni
PG College Seoni
Diwan Mahal and Wavadi Seoni

Tourist places in Seoni district
https://seoni.nic.in/en/tourism/
Pench National Park Karmaziri
Siddh Ghat Keolari
Payli Rest House Ghansore
Dalasagar Pond Seoni
Babariya reservoir Seoni

Ancient heritage of Seoni district
https://seoni.nic.in/en/tourism/
Ambika statue
Ashtabhuji Ganesha Statue
Ashtabhuji Durga Statue
Ashta Kali Ji Statue
Indra idol
Kalamdhari Ganesha Statue *Antara Aastha
Richaria Dev Statue
Vardhman Mahavir Swami Statue

References

 
Cities and towns in Seoni district
Populated places established in 1774
Cities in Madhya Pradesh